Qanchis Kancha (Quechua qanchis seven, kancha corral, "seven corrals", Hispanicized spelling Janchiscancha) is a mountain in the Andes of Peru, about  high. It is situated in the Lima Region, Huarochiri Province, Chicla District. Qanchis Kancha lies near the Antikuna mountain pass, southwest of Tikti Mach'ay and Jirish Mach'ay.

References

Mountains of Peru
Mountains of Lima Region